John Weatherspoon (January 27, 1942 – October 29, 2019), better known as John Witherspoon, was an American actor and comedian who performed in various television shows and films.

Witherspoon is best remembered for his role as Willie Jones in the Friday series; he also starred in films such as Hollywood Shuffle (1987), Boomerang (1992), The Five Heartbeats (1991), and Vampire in Brooklyn (1995). In addition, he made appearances on television shows such as The Fresh Prince of Bel-Air (1994), The Wayans Bros. (1995–99), The Tracy Morgan Show (2003), Barnaby Jones (1973), The Boondocks (2005–2014), and Black Jesus (2014–2019). He wrote a film, From the Old School, in which he played an elderly working man who tries to prevent a neighborhood convenience store from being developed into a strip club.

Early life 
Witherspoon was born on January 27, 1942, in Detroit, Michigan. He later changed his last name from Weatherspoon to Witherspoon. Witherspoon was one of 11 siblings. His older brother, William, became a songwriter for Motown, with whom he penned the lyrics of the 1966 hit single "What Becomes of the Brokenhearted". Another sibling, Cato, was a director of the PBS-TV Network/CH56 in Detroit. His sister, the late Dr. Gertrude Stacks, was a pastor at Shalom Fellowship International, a church in Detroit.

Witherspoon had a passion for music and learned to play the trumpet and French horn.

Career 
Witherspoon worked occasionally as a model. During the 1960s and 1970s, he began to take a liking towards comedy. During that time, he began his stand-up comedy career. As a result, he had many friends in the business, including Tim Reid (while he was working on WKRP in Cincinnati and The Richard Pryor Show), Robin Williams (also on The Richard Pryor Show), Jay Leno, and David Letterman.

Witherspoon performed in many feature films (usually comedies), including Friday (and its sequels Next Friday and Friday After Next), Hollywood Shuffle, I'm Gonna Git You Sucka, Bird, Vampire in Brooklyn, and The Meteor Man.

Witherspoon was also known for his over-the-top characters in films such as House Party, in which he played an irritated neighbor who is repeatedly woken up by the party, and  Boomerang with Eddie Murphy, where he plays Mr. Jackson, the ill-mannered father of Murphy's best friend.

Television 
His first television appearance was on the 1970s CBS television show Barnaby Jones, playing a camp counselor for drug addicted youth. Subsequent appearances were on Good Times, What's Happening!!, and The Incredible Hulk. In 1977, he became a regular on the series The Richard Pryor Show, an NBC American comedy series. This then led to his 1982 appearance in WKRP In Cincinnati, in which Witherspoon played Detective Davies, on the fourth-season episode "Circumstantial Evidence".

In 1981, he appeared in the NBC police drama Hill Street Blues, as a man who tries to buy a hotdog from undercover Detective Belker. Also in 1981, he had an appearance on NBC's legal drama L.A. Law, in the episode "On Your Honor" as Mark Steadman. He appeared in You Again? as Osborne. Other television show appearances include 227, which was an NBC comedy about women who lived in a majority black apartment complex, and What's Happening Now!!, the sequel to What's Happening!!.

Witherspoon was also featured in the American television sitcom Amen (1988), as the bailiff. The show, which ran on NBC, was known for being one of the shows during the 1980s that featured an almost entirely black cast.

Next came spots on Townsend Television (1993), Cosmic Slop (1994), and Murder Was The Case (1994) as a drunk.

He later appeared in the 1997 Living Single episode "Three Men and a Buckeye" as Smoke Eye Howard. His largest role in a television series was on The Wayans Bros. (1995–1999) which aired on The WB and starred Shawn and Marlon Wayans, who played brothers Shawn and Marlon Williams. Witherspoon played their father, John "Pops" Williams.

He was also on the Kids' WB animation series Waynehead, which was about a young boy growing up poor in Harlem, New York City. The show, which aired on Saturday mornings, was based on creator Damon Wayans' life.

In 2003, Witherspoon made a showing on NBC's Last Comic Standing, a reality television show that selected the top comedian out of a group and gave him a contract, in the Las Vegas finals. That same year, he performed as Oran Jones in The Proud Family episode "Adventures in Bebe Sitting". He later guest-starred in an episode of Kim Possible. During this time, Witherspoon was also featured as Spoon in all 18 episodes of the comedy series The Tracy Morgan Show.

In 2004, he appeared in Pryor Offenses, a television movie where he played Willie the Wino. In 2005, he was seen in the Comedy Central talk show Weekends at the D.L. where he portrayed the character of Michael Johnson. That same year, he began starring in Aaron McGruder's animated series The Boondocks as Robert Jebediah "Granddad" Freeman; this Cartoon Network/Adult Swim series ran for four seasons. In 2006, he performed as Real Santa, a Christmas singer on the radio, in the television movie, Thugaboo: A Miracle on D-Roc's Street, a story of a group of kids who find the true meaning of Christmas. His next appearance was on The Super Rumble Mixshow in 2008. In 2011, he starred in a Final Destination spoof with Shane Dawson on YouTube. In May 2013, he was featured on "Saturday (skit)", from rapper Logic's 2013 mixtape titled Young Sinatra: Welcome to Forever. He later performed in another Aaron McGruder series, Black Jesus, portraying Lloyd, a homeless man.

Music videos 
Witherspoon appeared in a number of music videos by artists in the music industry. In 2000, he was in the music video for hip-hop superstar Jay-Z's hit single "I Just Wanna Love U (Give It 2 Me)". He was also in the music video for Field Mob's song "Sick of Being Lonely". Other music video credits include Goodie Mob's "They Don't Dance No Mo'" and LL Cool J's "Ain't Nobody". In 2008, Witherspoon released a hip-hop comedy album titled "63 Cent".

Comedy tour 
Witherspoon went back to his comedian roots and started a comedy tour that premiered on television on March 28, 2008, on  Showtime. On his 2009 tour, he had 19 stops across the country. In December 2011, Witherspoon performed his stand-up comedy act once again on stage at the Funny Bone comedy club at Harrah's Casino in Tunica, Mississippi.

Personal life and death 
Witherspoon married Angela Robinson in 1988. They raised sons, John David ("J.D.") and Alexander. David Letterman was Witherspoon's best friend and is the godfather of his two sons.

On October 29, 2019, Witherspoon died of a heart attack at his home in Sherman Oaks, California. He was 77 years old. His funeral was held on November 5, 2019, and he was buried at Forest Lawn Memorial Park in Hollywood Hills, California.

Filmography

Film

Television

Albums
Comedy albums
 63 Cent (2008)

References 
Notes

Further reading

External links 
 Bio at bangbangbangbang.com (archived on November 26, 2011)
 
 John Witherspoon's "Cooking for Poor People" YouTube series

1942 births
2019 deaths
20th-century American comedians
20th-century American male actors
21st-century American comedians
21st-century American male actors
African-American male actors
African-American male comedians
African-American stand-up comedians
American male comedians
American male film actors
American male television actors
American male voice actors
American stand-up comedians
Burials at Forest Lawn Memorial Park (Hollywood Hills)
Male actors from Detroit